Theodore Thomas may refer to:

T. Gaillard Thomas (1832–1903), American gynecologist
Theodore Thomas (conductor) (1835–1905), American violinist and conductor
Theodore L. Thomas (1920–2005), American science fiction writer
Theodore Thomas (alderman) (born 1969), American politician, Chicago alderman
Theodore Thomas (filmmaker), American film director and producer

See also
Ted Thomas (disambiguation)